A federal agent (also known as a special agent, federal officer, or federal operative) is an employee of an agency or branch of the federal government, typically one responsible for investigating organized crime and terrorism, handling matters of domestic or national security, and who practices espionage, such as the FBI, CIA, NSA, or MI5. The following is a list of slang terms used to refer to federal agents, which are used by the public, members of organized crime, anti-establishment political groups or individuals, and occasionally other federal employees. This list does not encompass slang terms used to refer to local police departments, nor those which denote the agencies themselves.

List

References 

Slang terms for people